Carmen is a French-Italian musical drama film directed by Christian-Jaque and starring Viviane Romance, Jean Marais and Lucien Coëdel. It is a version of the famous opera. Although filmed in 1942 it was not released until 1944 in France and 1945 in Italy.

It was one of the most popular movies in France in 1945 with admissions of 4,277,813.

The film's sets were designed by the art director Robert Gys. It was shot at the Scalera Studios in Rome.

Cast
 Viviane Romance as Carmen 
 Jean Marais as Don José 
 Lucien Coëdel as Garcia 
 Julien Bertheau as Lucas, le matador / Lucas, il matador 
 Jean Brochard as Lillas-Pastia 
 Georges Tourreil as Dancaire 
 Adriano Rimoldi as Marquez, le lieutenant des Dragons / Marquez, il tenente dei Dragoni 
 Elli Parvo as Pamela 
 Mario Gallina as Un marchand / Un mercante 
 Marguerite Moreno as La gitane / La zingara 
 Bernard Blier as Remendado

References

Bibliography
 Anat Zanger. Film Remakes as Ritual and Disguise: From Carmen to Ripley. Amsterdam University Press, 2006.

External links
Carmen at IMDb
Review of film at The New York Times

1942 films
1940s musical drama films
Films based on Carmen
Films directed by Christian-Jaque
Films set in the 19th century
Films set in Spain
1940s historical musical films
French historical musical films
Italian historical musical films
Films shot at Scalera Studios
1940s French-language films
French musical drama films
Italian musical drama films
Italian black-and-white films
French black-and-white films
1942 drama films
Films about Romani people
1940s Italian films
1940s French films